The Goebbels Diaries are a collection of writings by Joseph Goebbels, a leading member of the National Socialist German Workers  Party (NSDAP) and the Reich Minister of Public Enlightenment and Propaganda in Adolf Hitler's government from 1933 to 1945. The diaries, which have only recently been published in full in German and are available only in part in English, are a major source for the inner history of the Nazi Party and of its twelve years in power in Germany. The British historian Ian Kershaw wrote in the preface to his biography of Hitler: "For all the caution which must naturally be attached to Goebbels's regularly reported remarks by Hitler ... the immediacy as well as the frequency of the comments makes them a vitally important source of insight into Hitler's thinking and action."

History
Goebbels began to keep a diary in October 1923, shortly before his 26th birthday, while unemployed and living in his parents' home at Rheydt in the Ruhr region. He had been given a diary as a present by Else Janke, a young woman (of part-Jewish background) with whom he had a turbulent but eventually unsuccessful relationship, and most of his early entries were about her. His biographer Toby Thacker writes: "Writing a diary quickly became a kind of therapy for this troubled young man, and several historians have commented on how extraordinarily candid and revealing Goebbels was, particularly in his early years as a diarist." From 1923 onwards he wrote in his diary almost daily.

According to biographer Peter Longerich, Goebbels' diary entries from late 1923 to early 1924 reflected the writings of a man who was isolated, preoccupied by "religious-philosophical" issues, and lacked a sense of direction. Diary entries of mid-December 1923 forward show Goebbels was moving towards the völkisch nationalist movement. Goebbels first took an interest in Adolf Hitler and Nazism in March 1924. In February 1924, Hitler's trial for treason had begun in the wake of his failed attempt to seize power in Munich, Bavaria, during 8–9 November 1923 (this failed coup became known as the Beer Hall Putsch). The trial garnered Hitler much press and gave him a platform for propaganda. After Goebbels first met Hitler in July 1925, however, the Nazi leader increasingly became the central figure in the diary. By July 1926 Goebbels was so enraptured by Hitler speaking on "racial issues", that he wrote: "It is impossible to reproduce what [Hitler] said. It must be experienced. He is a genius. The natural, creative instrument of a fate determined by God. I am deeply moved.".

Hitler became Chancellor in January 1933 and appointed Goebbels Propaganda Minister. Goebbels then published an edited version of his diaries for the period of Hitler's rise to power in book form, under the title Vom Kaiserhof zur Reichskanzlei: Eine historische Darstellung in Tagebuchblättern (From the Kaiserhof to the Reich Chancellery: a Historical Diary). The Kaiserhof was a Berlin hotel where Hitler stayed before he came to power. Goebbels's book was later published in English as My Part in Germany's Fight. Although this book was propagandist in intent, it provides insight into the mentality of the Nazi leadership at the time of their accession to power.

By July 1941 the diaries had grown to fill twenty thick volumes, and Goebbels realised that they were too valuable a resource to risk their destruction in an air raid. He therefore moved them from his study in his Berlin home to the underground vaults of the Reichsbank in central Berlin. From this time onwards, he no longer wrote the diaries by hand. Instead he dictated them to a stenographer, who later typed up corrected versions. He began each day's entry with a resume of the day's military and political news. Thacker notes: "Goebbels was already aware that his diary constituted a remarkable historical document, and entertained fond hopes of reworking it at some future stage for further publication, devoting hours to each day's entry." The involvement of a stenographer, however, meant that the diaries were no longer entirely secret, and they became less frank about personal matters.

By November 1944 it was evident to Goebbels that Germany was going to lose the war. He wrote in his diary: "How distant and alien indeed this beautiful world appears. Inwardly I have already taken leave of it." Realising that he was unlikely to survive the fall of the Third Reich, he gave orders that his diaries were to be copied for safekeeping, using the new technique of microfilm. A special darkroom was created in Goebbels's apartment in central Berlin, and Goebbels's stenographer, Richard Otte, supervised the work.

Goebbels made the last entry in his diary on the afternoon of 1 May 1945, hours before his death, but it was not preserved. The last preserved entry dates to 9 April 1945. The boxes of glass plates containing the microfilmed diaries were sent in April 1945 to Potsdam just west of Berlin, where they were buried. The original handwritten and typed diaries were packed and stored in the Reich Chancellery. Some of these survived, and formed the basis for the publication of sections of the diaries (mainly from the war years) after the war. The boxes of glass plates at Potsdam were discovered by the Soviets and shipped to Moscow, where they sat unopened until they were discovered by the German historian Elke Fröhlich in 1992. Only then did the publication of the full diaries become possible.

Publications

In German
A 29-volume edition, spanning the years 1923–1945, was edited by Elke Fröhlich and others.  It is said to be 98% complete.  Publication began  in 1993, with the last volume appearing in 2008. Die Tagebücher von Joseph Goebbels was published on behalf of the Institut für Zeitgeschichte and with the support of the National Archives Service of Russia by K. G. Saur Verlag in Munich. Full information follows:

Die Tagebücher von Joseph Goebbels, Teil I Aufzeichnungen 1923–1941 [The Diaries of Joseph Goebbels, Part I: Notations, 1923–1941]

Die Tagebücher von Joseph Goebbels, Teil II Diktate 1941–1945 [The Diaries of Joseph Goebbels, Part II: Dictations, 1941–1945] :

Die Tagebücher von Joseph Goebbels, Teil III Register 1923–1945 [The Diaries of Joseph Goebbels, Part III: Register, 1923–1945]:

 Astrid M. Eckert, Stefan Martens, "Glasplatten im märkischen Sand: Ein Beitrag zur Überlieferungsgeschichte der Tageseinträge und Diktate von Joseph Goebbels," Vierteljahrshefte für Zeitgeschichte 52 (2004): 479–526.
 Angela Hermann, "In 2 Tagen wurde Geschichte gemacht". Über den Charakter und Erkenntniswert der Goebbels-Tagebücher ["In Two Days, History Was Made": About the Character and Scientific Value of the Goebbels Diary]. Published in Stuttgart in 2008.
 Angela Hermann, Der Weg in den Krieg 1938/39. Quellenkritische Studien zu den Tagebüchern von Joseph Goebbels.  München 2011.

In English translation
The Goebbels Diaries, 1939–1941, edited and translated by Fred Taylor.  First published in London by Hamish Hamilton in 1982.  The first American edition was published by Putnam in 1983. This translation of a previously unpublished part of Goebbel's diaries was the subject of controversy.
The Goebbels Diaries, 1942–1943 was translated, edited, and introduced by Louis P. Lochner.  First published by Doubleday in 1948.  It was reprinted by Greenwood Press in 1970
Final Entries 1945: The Diaries of Joseph Goebbels was edited, introduced, and annotated by Hugh Trevor-Roper.  First published by Putnam in 1978.  An annotated edition was published by Pen and Sword in 2008.

David Irving Controversy
In 1992, historian and Holocaust denier David Irving was tipped off that in May, 1945, Soviet soldiers had found 200 partially burned volumes and carted away copies of the diaries on glass microfiche where they were stored under lock and key at the Central State Archives in Moscow. Because the new archival material showed passages in Goebbel's handwriting that had only previously appeared in print, it was possible to authenticate previous editions.  The Sunday Times of London paid Irving $125,000 to authenticate and translate the newly-discovered material. This created a minor scandal with protests outside Irving's London home. Irving's archival research became the basis for his work, "Goebbels: Mastermind of the Third Reich" which was contracted by St. Martin's Press to be published in 1996. Due to political pressure, St. Martin's broke the contract - an action that was criticized by public intellectual Christopher Hitchens.

Ironically, Irving's research into Goebbel's diaries provided some of the best evidence for the Holocaust. The diaries reveal Goebbels was copied on the Wannsee Conference protocol, a January 1942 conference of Nazi leaders held to decide the final solution. Holocaust deniers claim the protocol is a fabrication. The diary entry of March 27 1942 states, “Beginning with Lublin,” he states, “the Jews are now being deported eastward from the General Government [occupied Poland]. The procedure is pretty barbaric and one that beggars description, and there’s not much left of the Jews. Broadly speaking one can probably say that 60 percent of them will have to be liquidated, while only 40 percent can be put to work. The Moscow plate is identical to that held by the Hoover Institution, meaning there is no way the text could have been faked.

References

Sources

 
 
 
 
 
 
 

Diaries
Nazi propaganda
Political autobiographies
Doubleday (publisher) books
Joseph Goebbels